Echinopedinidae is a family of echinoderms.

References 

Prehistoric echinoderm families
Eocene first appearances
Eocene extinctions